Arch Stanton is the sixth studio album by the instrumental stoner rock band Karma to Burn. It was released on August 18, 2014 by FABA and Deepdive Records. The album was reissued in 2023 by Heavy Psych Sounds Records.

Unlike their previous release V, this album returns to their exclusively instrumental roots, although the final track features dialogue snippets from the classic Spaghetti Western The Good, the Bad and the Ugly, from which the album title is derived.

Track listing
Standard release

Personnel 
 William Mecum – guitar, bass
 Evan Devine – drums

References

2014 albums
Karma to Burn albums
Instrumental rock albums